Charlotte de Witte (born 21 July 1992) is a Belgian DJ and record producer, best known for her "dark and stripped-back" brand of minimal techno and acid techno music. She has previously performed under the alias Raving George. She is the founder of the label KNTXT.

Early life and career
de Witte was born in Ghent, Belgium on 21 July 1992. Around 2009, she started to explore Ghent's underground nightclub scene, where she was drawn to electronic music. She started DJing in 2010, mainly playing electro music; her production work commenced about two years later. Winning a Studio Brussel DJ contest in 2011, she subsequently performed at the Tomorrowland festival. She adopted the alias Raving George to avoid negative preconceptions against female DJs, releasing her debut EP in 2013. Following the release of a string of EPs on Bad Life and Crux Records, her 2015 single "You're Mine," which featured Oscar and the Wolf, became a hit.

In 2015, de Witte dropped her alias and started using her real name.  Her debut EP under her name, Weltschmerz, was released on the same year on Turbo Recordings. These were followed by a string of 2017 EPs, as well as 2018's Heart of Mine and The Healer EPs. de Witte has performed at various notable electronic music events, including Junction 2 Festival, Boiler Room and Printworks.

In 2019, she launched her own label, KNTXT. Artists such as Chris Liebing, Monoloc, Alignment have been welcomed to KNTXT.

On December 31, 2020, she performed at Tomorrowland, which was held online virtually due to COVID-19.

On February 5, 2021, she announced her engagement to Italian techno DJ and producer Enrico Sangiuliano via social media. On February 25, 2021, she performed online on open space at the ancient stadium of Messene, after being invited by the Onassis Foundation.

On April 29, 2021, she streamed in collaboration with Formula 1, from the Autodromo Internazionale del Mugello racetrack, ahead of her Formula EP. de Witte is The World's No. 1 Techno DJ in DJ Mag's 100 DJs 2022 and No. 14 in 2022 main poll.

Discography
Charlotte de Witte discography as adapted from Discogs:

DJ mixes
 Turbo Promo DJ Mix (2016)
 Connection (2017)
 Groove Podcast 163 (2018)
 SonneMondSterne XXII (2018)

Extended plays
 Monodon Monoceros (2013; as Raving George)
 Obverse EP (2013; as Raving George)
 Slaves / Alternate (2013; as Raving George)
 Weltschmerz (2015)
 Trip (2016)
 Sehnsucht (2016)
 Actually (2016)
 Brussels (2017)
 Voices of the Ancient (2017)
 Closer (2017) 
 Our Journey (2017)
 Wisdom (2017)
 Heart Of Mine (2018)
 The Healer (2018)
 Liquid Slow (2019; collaboration with Chris Liebing)
 Pressure (2019)
 Selected (2019)
 Vision (2020)
 Return To Nowhere (2020)
 Rave On Time (2020)
 Formula (2021)
 Asura (2021)
 Universal Consciousness (2022)
 Apollo (2022)

Singles
 "You're Mine" featuring Oscar and the Wolf (2015; as Raving George)
 "The Age Of Love featuring (Enrico Sangiuliano) (2021)

Remixes
 Jerome Isma-Ae - Hold That Sucker Down (Trance & Rave remix) (2020)
 Bob Moses & Zhu - Desire (2020)

Awards and nominations

DJ Awards

DJ Mag's top 100 DJs

DJ Mag's Alternative top 100 DJs powered by Beatport

International Dance Music Awards

References

External links

Living people
1992 births
Musicians from Ghent
21st-century Belgian musicians
Belgian DJs
Belgian electronic musicians
Belgian women musicians
Belgian record producers
Electronic dance music DJs
Women DJs
Mute Records artists
Women in electronic music
Women record producers
Techno musicians
21st-century women musicians